Capital intensive industry was a mid- to late- 19th century development in industry that required great investments of money for machinery and infrastructure to make a profit.

Industrial progress was expensive and business people faced real problems. The start up costs of new enterprises skyrocketed. The early textile mills had required relatively small amounts of capital in comparison to the new ironworks and steelworks.  Capital intensive industry replaced labor-intensive production, which relied on the hiring of more workers. The distribution and consumption of goods failed to keep pace with industrial growth. Increased productivity in both agriculture and industry led to rapidly declining prices.

Industrial Revolution